Mysteries of the Bible is an hour-long television series that was originally broadcast by A&E from March 25, 1994 until June 13, 1998 and A&E aired reruns of it until 2002. The series was about biblical mysteries and was produced by FilmRoos. The Discovery Channel and BBC also released a series of the same name in 2003. National Geographic produced a series with this title in 2006.

List of episodes

Pilot

Season 1

Season 2

Season 3

Season 4

Season 5

Note that there may be more episodes.

Discovery Series
 The Exodus Revealed
 Helena
 The Secret of the Dead Sea Scrolls
 Jesus and the Shroud of Turin
 Heaven, Our Eternal Home
 The Gates of Jerusalem

See also
The Bible's Buried Secrets - a PBS documentary (2008)
History's Mysteries, 1998-2006
List of Digging for the Truth episodes
Daniel L. Smith-Christopher

References

External links
 Internet Movie Database: Mysteries of the Bible
 A&E Store
 Discovery Store
 Variety Magazine review of Mysteries of the Bible: Abraham: One Man, One God, Alan Rich, January 6, 1995
 Amazon Episode page

Television series based on the Bible
A&E (TV network) original programming
1994 American television series debuts
1998 American television series endings
English-language television shows